Sarıcəfərli is a village and municipality in the Masally Rayon of Azerbaijan. It has a population of 444.

References

Populated places in Masally District